Eimear Moran (born 21 February 1984) is an Irish competitive cyclist and rower who has represented Ireland at European and World events.

Personal life
Born in Tullamore, Moran began rowing competitively when she was 14. Her first international race was the junior European championships where she won silver in the quad event. She attended university at the University of Sunderland.

Rowing
In 2000, she won the junior doubles at the Irish national championships and represented The King's Hospital at the Henley Regatta where she also won. Competing for Ireland she won bronze and silver in the women's single scull at the Nations Cup in Copenhagen and the World Cup in rowing for U23s. In 2001, she again had victory in the single sculls at the Henley regatta. Moran then was the only Irish rower to be selected and represented Ireland in the World Junior Championships in Duisburg, Germany where she completed the competition ranked 11th.

2002 saw Moran win the Henley regatta and Irish national championships as well as again represent Ireland at the World Junior Championship. 2004 saw her winning Henley as a member of a double sculls team and attend the World University Championships at Brive in France. 2010 saw her return to Henley after a break where she again won but this time in quadruple sculls. She began training for national selection and represented Ireland at European, World and international regattas. However, by 2015 she had begun to compete in cycling rather than rowing.

Cycling
Cycling for the Sundrive track team in 2015 Moran won four individual gold medals at the National Track Championships and two medals for team events at competitions earlier in the same year. Although these were track events Moran has also won several road races.
Moran has now won several races with national record times.

Career results
2016
1st Keirin, Dublin Track Cycling International
Athens Track Grand Prix
2nd Sprint
3rd 500m Time Trial

References

External links
World Cycling League
Eimear Moran Wins Rás an Laois in only her third ever cycling race - Women's Cycling Ireland

1984 births
Living people
Irish female rowers
People from Tullamore, County Offaly
Irish female cyclists